Abbotsford may refer:

Places
Australia
 Abbotsford, New South Wales, a suburb of Sydney, Australia
 Abbotsford, Picton, a heritage-listed farm in south-western Sydney 
 Abbotsford, Victoria, a suburb of Melbourne, Australia
 Abbotsford Station, Queensland

Canada
 Abbotsford, British Columbia, a city in Canada 
 Abbotsford (electoral district), an electoral district surrounding the Canadian city

New Zealand
 Abbotsford, New Zealand, a suburb of Dunedin, New Zealand

South Africa
 Abbotsford, Gauteng, a suburb of Johannesburg, South Africa

United Kingdom
 Abbotsford, West Sussex, a village in West Sussex

United States of America
 Abbotsford, Wisconsin
 Abbotsford (Boston, Massachusetts)

Other uses
Abbotsford Canucks, AHL affiliate of the Vancouver Canucks
Abbotsford, Cuddington, a house in Cheshire, England
Abbotsford furniture, a neo-Gothic furniture made during the 1820s and 1830s and named after Sir Walter Scott's baronial house
Abbotsford House, Scottish Borders; home of Scottish novelist Sir Walter Scott, near Melrose, Scotland
Abbotsford ware, a pottery produced by the Kirkcaldy Pottery in Fife in the late 19th. and early 20th. centuries

See also

Abbotsford Club, a 19th-century publisher of Middle-English literature
1979 Abbotsford landslip, a major landslide which occurred in Abbotsford, New Zealand